Brent International School is an international co-educational day and boarding school associated with the Episcopal Church in the Philippines. It has campuses in different locations throughout the Philippines: Brent School Manila in Brgy. Mamplasan, Biñan (Main Campus); Brent School Baguio, and Brent School Subic.

Campuses

Baguio

Brent Baguio was previously the main campus of Brent, founded in 1909 by Charles Henry Brent, Missionary Bishop in the Philippine Islands for the Protestant Episcopal Church of United States, the successor of which is the Episcopal Church of the Philippines. A number of similar boarding schools were established by Episcopal clerics across the United States, including in Brent's home state of Massachusetts, including the so-called Saint Grottlesex schools, based upon the English public school model. Spread across thirty hectares of forested land, the Baguio campus houses buildings that survived World War II and the 1990 Luzon earthquake. In 2001, the Brent Baguio campus was given the status of National Historical Site by the Philippine Historical Commission. In 2009, Brent Baguio celebrated their centennial. Brent Baguio is the only campus which has boarding facilities; the other 2 campuses are day schools only.
Coordinates:

Manila
In 1984, the Board of Trustees of Brent School established Brent International School Manila in Pasig, Metro Manila (that location has since closed). This second Brent school assumed the traditions, the style, and the educational system of its mother school, and its first twelve students graduated in 1986. Brent School Manila is now the Main Campus, located in Biñan, and the member school of Asia Pacific Activities Conference. The campus contains two learning center buildings; one for the upper school, middle school and lower school students and the other for students below third grade. The school also has two fields for after-school activities and an oval track.
Coordinates:

Subic
Brent School Subic is located at Bldg. 6601, Binictican Drive, Subic Bay Freeport Zone, Zambales. In September 1994, the Board of Trustees of Brent Schools, Inc. received an invitation from the Honorable Richard J. Gordon, SBMA Chairman, to open a school in Subic for children of foreign investors and residents of the local community. The Board of Trustees accepted Mr. Gordon's invitation with great optimism and was subsequently granted use of the facilities of the Binictican Elementary School originally built by the U.S. Navy for its dependents.
Coordinates:

Academics
The Brent Baguio, Brent Subic, and Brent Manila campuses have four divisions for academics: the Early Learning Program (kindergarten-grade 2), Lower School (grades 3-5), Middle School (grades 6-8), and Upper School (grades 9-12). In the Upper School, the curriculum is college preparatory.

The International Baccalaureate Program
Brent Baguio, Brent Subic, and Brent Manila are among the few schools in the Philippines to offer the International Baccalaureate Diploma Programme for students in the 11th and 12th grades. Brent follows an inclusive rather than exclusive policy for the International Baccalaureate Program, allowing any students willing to undertake the heavy course loads to do so. Despite this inclusive philosophy, the average pass rate for Brent diploma candidates for the classes of 2001 to 2007 was 87.3%, well above the world mean of 81.4% for all diploma candidates during the same period. In fact, the last five years the average pass rate was 91.2%. Further, the mean score for Brent IB Diploma awardees over those seven years was 32.7 points, likewise significantly above the 30.1 world mean for the same years.

School Crest
The meaning of the Brent School Crest:
The Lion stands for pride and courage;
The Laurel Leaves stand for knowledge and learning;
The 6 stars stand for loyalty, integrity, courtesy, sincerity, honesty, and camaraderie.

The Brent School crest was revised for the Manila and Subic campuses, but the elements remain constant. The Manila and Subic campuses each use a redrawn crest while Brent Baguio retains the original crest.

References

External links
Brent International School Manila
Brent International School Baguio
Brent International School Subic
International Baccalaureate Organisation
Accrediting Commission for Schools Western Association of Schools and Colleges
East Asia Regional Council of Overseas Schools 

International schools in the Philippines
International schools in Metro Manila
International Baccalaureate schools in the Philippines
East Asia Regional Council of Overseas Schools
Schools in Biñan
Educational institutions established in 1909
1909 establishments in the Philippines